Mikhail is a given name.

Mikhail may also refer to:

 List of people with given name Mikhail
 Mikhail of Vladimir (died in 1176), Grand Prince of Kyiv and of Vladimir
 Mikhail of Chernigov (c. 1185–1246), grand prince of Kiev and prince of several Rus principalities
 Mikhail of Tver (1271–1318), Grand Prince of Vladimir
 Mikhail II of Tver (1333–1399), Grand Prince of Tver and of Vladimir
 Mikhail III of Tver (1453–1505), last prince of Tver
 Mikhail of Russia (Mikhail I Fyodorovich Romanov) (1596–1645)
 Mikhail, Prince of Abkhazia (died 1866), the head of state of the Principality of Abkhazia
 Mikhail Gorbachev (1931–2022), Soviet and Russian politician

See also
 Mikheil Meskhi Stadium, multi-purpose stadium in Tbilisi, Georgia
 
 Michael (disambiguation)